<noinclude>

It is a middle form of the Abra line, eventually evolving into Alakazam. It is a primarily yellow, humanoid Pokémon that has two long, pointed ears on top of its head, a red star on its forehead, narrow, deep-set eyes and wide cheeks leading down to a thin snout. Kadabra was created by Ken Sugimori, it first appeared in the video games Pokémon Red and Blue and in later sequels. It has appeared in various merchandise, spinoff titles and animated and printed adaptations of the franchise.

In the Pokémon anime, Kadabra appear under the ownership of Sabrina. It appears in the Pokémon Adventures manga in various roles. IGN described Kadabra as "losing most of its charm" as it progressed their evolution. Kadabra received mixed responses from critics.

Design and characteristics
Kadabra is one of the Pokémon conceived by Game Freak's character development team and finalized by Ken Sugimori for the first generation of Pocket Monsters games Red and Green, which were localized outside Japan as Pokémon Red and Blue. Originally called Yungerer in Japanese, Nintendo changed the name as part of an initiative to localize various species names to English audiences in order to make them more relatable. Kadabra was initially intended to be named Pocus (with its earlier form being named Hocus) for American audiences, but it and its predecessor were named Kadabra and Abra respectively, based on the incantation along with its final form, Alakazam.

Kadabra is a bipedal Pokémon characterized by a humanoid body structure and somewhat fox-like appearance. It has armor-like characteristics, featuring pauldron-shaped pieces on its shoulders and a fauld-like piece around its chest. It has three fingers on each hand and three toes on each foot, with two toes in the front on either side and one in the back near the ankle. It also has a thick tail. Kadabra also has a large mustache, which is larger for male members of the species. It has a red star-shaped symbol on its forehead, and three red wavy lines on its fauld-like torso that resemble symbols used on zener cards. Kadabra, as well as its other forms, is capable of using telepathy as well as manipulating others' minds. It can also teleport.

Appearances

In video games
The first video game appearance Kadabra, as well as its other forms, was in Pokémon Red and Blue versions. Kadabra evolves from Abra after accumulating enough experience, and evolves into Alakazam only when traded from one copy of a Pokémon game to another. Kadabra appears in every new version of Red and Blue, as well as every sequel to it. Kadabra is encountered as an opponent of multiple trainers, including the Gym Leader Sabrina. Kadabra has also appeared in every subsequent Pokémon game.

Outside of the main series, Kadabra appeared in Pokémon Pinball, Pokémon Stadium, Pokémon Stadium 2, Pokémon Pinball: Ruby & Sapphire, Pokémon Trozei!, Pokémon Mystery Dungeon: Blue Rescue Team and Red Rescue Team, Pokémon Ranger, Pokémon Mystery Dungeon: Explorers of Time and Explorers of Darkness, Pokémon Mystery Dungeon: Explorers of Sky, Pokémon Rumble, Pokémon Rumble Blast, PokéPark 2: Wonders Beyond, Pokémon Conquest, Pokémon Rumble U, Pokémon Battle Trozei, Pokémon Shuffle, Pokémon Rumble World, Pokémon Picross and Pokémon Rumble Rush.

In anime and printed adaptations
In the Pokémon anime, the Saffron City Gym Leader, Sabrina owns an Abra, which she sends out in a battle against the series protagonist, Ash. After battling, Sabrina's Abra evolves into Kadabra, causing Ash to forfeit the match due to Kadabra's new and more powerful psychic abilities. Ash later returns for a rematch, and Ash's Haunter makes Sabrina laugh, which causes Kadabra to also laugh due to the psychic bond it has with Sabrina. Because of Kadabra and Sabrina's laughter, they are unable to fight, and hand over the gym badge. A Kadabra later appears in an abandoned mining colony with several other Psychic-type Pokémon in "Fear Factor Phony", which was the last physical of Kadabra in the anime to date. However, it’s prevolution Abra and it's evolution Alakazam continue to appear in the anime.

Like in the anime, Sabrina owns a Kadabra in the Pokémon Adventures manga.

Cultural impact

Reception
IGN noted that Kadabra represented a loss of charm compared to Abra, stating that Kadabra is less cute than Abra. IGN also regarded Kadabra as one of the "best Psychic types", alongside Alakazam, Mew, Mewtwo, and Starmie. The St. Petersburg Times also praised Kadabra, calling its naming scheme in conjunction with its other forms "clever." Lyra Hale of The Mary Sue claimed that "it got absolutely wild when Kadabra was given a gremlin makeover." Jessica Famularo of Inverse has claimed that Kadabra is spooky Pokémon, stating that "Kadabra doesn’t evolve from a cute teleport-happy Abra. Instead, children with ESP live in constant fear that one day they might awaken as a mustachioed monster", while George Chrysostomou of Screen Rant described Kadabra's lore as "myth", when the Pokémon was created only after the children transformed into Kadabra.

1UP FM praised its design, and the hosts regarded Kadabra as one of their favorites and that they were "impressed" with its design. In a poll conducted by IGN, Kadabra was voted as the 91st best Pokémon. Shacknews and The Red Bulletin both described Kadabra as the most disturbing Pokémon of all time in Gen I, while both of IGN staffs has also claimed that Kadabra is a tenth of the scariest Pokémon.

Controversy
Some fundamentalist Christian groups have targeted Kadabra as representing anti-Christian aspects of the franchise. In Palm Beach, Florida, Pastor Eugene Walton distributed pamphlets that described the symbol on its head as "a pentagram" (even though Kadabra simply has a red five-pointed star on its head, different from a pentagram) and claimed the symbol on its chest was representative of Nazi Germany's Waffen-SS.

In November 2000, it was reported that Uri Geller, an Israeli "psychic"-magician who claims to bend spoons with his mind, sued Nintendo over the Pokémon Kadabra, due to its Japanese name (Yungera) which he claimed was an unauthorized appropriation of his identity. Geller learned of the similarity after fans of both himself and Pokémon noted a resemblance to the character's Japanese name, behavior and face and presented him with cards of the character to autograph after he had finished taping a television special in Japan. He further claimed that the star on Kadabra's forehead and the lightning patterns on its abdomen, were symbols popular with the Waffen-SS and that, through the character, Nintendo had "turned him into an evil, occult Pokémon character". Nintendo countered by stating there was no connection between the two and that they had not named any of the Pokémon after actual people to the knowledge of their staff. In 2008, Pokémon anime director and storyboard artist Masamitsu Hidaka confirmed in an interview that Kadabra would not be used on a Pokémon Trading Card until an agreement was reached on the case. In November 2020, after Geller told TheGamer that he received an amount of emails from Pokémon fans convincing him to drop the case and allow Nintendo to bring back Kadabra, Geller announced he had given Nintendo permission to resume printing Pokémon cards depicting Kadabra.

References

External links

 
Kadabra on Pokemon.com

Anime and manga characters who can teleport
Anime and manga telepaths
Fictional characters who can teleport
Fictional characters with precognition
Fictional hypnotists and indoctrinators
Fictional psychics
Fictional telekinetics
Fictional telepaths
Pokémon species
Telepath characters in video games
Video game characters introduced in 1996
Video game characters who can teleport
Video game characters who have mental powers
Video game controversies